Freefolk is a village in Hampshire, England. It lies to the west and almost directly alongside the village of Laverstoke; the two villages are separated by the River Test.
 

In the village is an inn named the "Watership Down", known locally as "the jerry".

The village name was brought to many people's attention by the "Forever Freefolk" garden at the 2016 Chelsea Flower Show, sponsored by Brewin Dolphin and designed by Rosy Hardy of local nursery Hardy's Cottage Garden Plants. The garden highlighted the fragility of England's chalk streams, and won a silver medal.

Governance
The village is part of the civil parish of Laverstoke and is part of the Overton, Laverstoke and Steventon ward of Basingstoke and Deane borough council. The borough council is a Non-metropolitan district of Hampshire County Council.

See also
St Nicholas' Church, Freefolk

References

External links

Villages in Hampshire
Test Valley